Having a Great Birth in Australia  is the second book from Australian writer David Vernon.

The book is an edited anthology of birth experiences, that demonstrate that birth can be a positive, life-affirming event, and that it need not, with the right support, be the trauma that the media often suggests childbirth is.  The experiences described are diverse, ranging from caesarean births and VBAC births, to births that take place at home and in a birth centre or labour ward. All of the mothers in this book chose to have their birth care provided by an individual midwife.  These stories express the experiential aspects of childbirth and are used to educate midwives. There is also a description of a miscarriage and a stillbirth and the stories explain how the women managed to overcome their feelings of grief at the event.

This book set the style and content for Vernon's subsequent book, Men at Birth which describes men's experience of birth.

References

Further reading

External links
Having a Great Birth in Australia

Health and wellness books
Maternity in Australia
Works about human pregnancy
Midwifery in Australia